Ahmaad Smith (born February 28, 1983) is a former American football defensive back who played one season with the Iowa Barnstormers of the Arena Football League (AFL). He played college football at Tennessee State University. He was also a member of the Mississippi MudCats, Texas Copperheads, Team Tennessee, BC Lions, Toronto Argonauts and Pittsburgh Power. Smith appeared on Michael Irvin's reality show 4th and Long.

Early years
Smith played basketball in high school and did not play football until his senior year.

College career
Smith was a four-year letterman and two-year starter for the Tennessee State Tigers from 2002 to 2005, recording 13 tackles, three pass break ups and one interception. He was a defensive captain his senior season in 2005. He also played basketball for the Tigers. Smith earned his BBA in business information systems from Tennessee State University in 2006.

Professional career
Smith played in six games for the Mississippi MudCats of the American Indoor Football Association during the 2007 season, recording 14.5 tackles, five pass breakups and four interceptions for 34 yards and one touchdown. He played for the Texas Copperheads of the af2 in 2007, recording 14.5 total tackles, one interception, 8 pass breakups and one forced fumble. He was selected by Team Tennessee of the All American Football League (AAFL) with the 218th pick in the 2008 AAFL Draft and signed with the team on February 7, 2008. The AAFL later cancelled the 2008 season and never began play. Smith was signed by the BC Lions of the Canadian Football League (CFL) on May 13, 2008. He was released by the Lions on June 15, 2008. He was a finalist on Michael Irvin's reality show 4th and Long. Smith signed with the Toronto Argonauts of the CFL on January 29, 2010. He was released by the Argonauts on June 20, 2010. He was assigned to the Iowa Barnstormers of the Arena football League (AFL) on November 10, 2009 and played for the team during the 2010 season, recording two tackles. Smith was assigned to the Pittsburgh Power of the AFL on October 12, 2011. He was reassigned by the Power on February 27, 2012.

Coaching career
Smith served as defensive backs coach of the Hampden–Sydney Tigers of Hampden–Sydney College. He was the runner-up for the American Football Coaches Association Division III Assistant Coach of the Year Award in 2013. He was awarded The Bill Walsh Minority Coaching Internship to the Tennessee Titans in 2015, working with the defensive backs. Smith has also served as a football coach at Northview High School in Johns Creek, Georgia. He became defensive backs coach of the Catawba Indians of Catawba College in 2015.

Personal life
Smith's father also played football for the Tennessee State Tigers. NFL player Richard Dent is Ahmaad's godfather.

References

External links
 Tennessee State profile
 Just Sports Stats

Living people
1983 births
American football defensive backs
American men's basketball players
Canadian football defensive backs
BC Lions players
Catawba Indians football coaches
Hampden–Sydney Tigers football coaches
Iowa Barnstormers players
Mississippi MudCats players
Pittsburgh Power players
Tennessee State Tigers football coaches
Tennessee State Tigers football players
Tennessee State Tigers basketball players
Texas Copperheads players
Toronto Argonauts players
High school football coaches in Georgia (U.S. state)
Sportspeople from Nashville, Tennessee
Basketball players from Nashville, Tennessee
Players of American football from Nashville, Tennessee
African-American coaches of American football
African-American players of American football
African-American players of Canadian football
African-American basketball players
21st-century African-American sportspeople
20th-century African-American people